Kadai may refer to:

Karahi, also known as Kadai, a cooking utensil used mainly in Indian cooking
Kra–Dai languages, also known as Kadai or Tai–Kadai, a language family of Southeast Asia
Gedai, Bushehr, also known as Kadā’ī and Kedā’ī, a village in Bushehr Province, Iran